Solid Gold Hits is a greatest hits collection by Beastie Boys, released in November 2005. In contrast to 1999's The Sounds of Science double-CD anthology, Solid Gold Hits is one CD consisting of tracks that were released as singles, with the exception of "Shake Your Rump". A limited edition includes a DVD with the music videos for the same tracks. The Japanese release has a bonus song and video, "Right Right Now Now".

The cover photo by Josh Cheuse features a JVC RC-M90 boombox, known as "The King of Boomboxes".

Track listing

Charts

References

External links

2005 greatest hits albums
2005 video albums
Beastie Boys compilation albums
Beastie Boys video albums
Capitol Records compilation albums
Capitol Records video albums
Music video compilation albums
Albums produced by Rick Rubin
Albums produced by Mario Caldato Jr.